Daiji Morii (born 4 August 1967) is a Japanese former professional tennis player.

Morii reached a best singles ranking of 446 on the professional tour, which included a qualifying draw appearance at the Wimbledon Championships. He was a singles quarter-finalist at the Réunion Island Challenger in 1993, with wins over Éric Winogradsky and Mark Kaplan. His only ATP Tour main draw came in doubles at the 1996 Japan Open.

References

External links
 
 

1967 births
Living people
Japanese male tennis players
20th-century Japanese people